Dragon Age: Dreadwolf is an upcoming role-playing video game being developed by BioWare and to be published by Electronic Arts. The fourth major game in the Dragon Age franchise, Dreadwolf will be the sequel to Dragon Age: Inquisition (2014).

Development 
The development of the fourth main entry in the Dragon Age series, code-named "Joplin", began in 2015 with Mike Laidlaw as its creative director. It was intended to be a smaller, more narrative-focused game set in the Tevinter Imperium region of the game's world setting, Thedas.

Problems with the development of BioWare's other games Mass Effect: Andromeda and Anthem led to repeated interruptions as "Joplin" staff was shifted to these games. This included putting "Joplin" on hold in late 2016 with development resuming in March 2017 after Andromeda shipped. In October 2017, BioWare and its parent company Electronic Arts cancelled "Joplin" altogether, reportedly because it had no room for a "live service" component to provide ongoing monetization opportunities.  

Development of the game was restarted under the code-name "Morrison" in 2018, this time with a live-service component and based on Anthems code.  According to Bloomberg News, after the success of the single-player game Star Wars Jedi: Fallen Order and the decision to cancel the reworking of the massively multiplayer online Anthem in February 2021 following its lackluster launch, EA and BioWare decided to remove the planned multiplayer components from "Morrison" and to develop it as a single-player game only. 

The project has been marked by a high turnover of leading staff. Several veteran Dragon Age staff, including Laidlaw, left the company in response to Joplin's cancellation in 2017. After the 2018 restart, Mark Darrah remained as an executive producer, while Matthew Goldman took over the position of creative director for the project from 2017 to 2021. By December 3, 2020, Darrah had resigned from BioWare, replaced by BioWare Austin studio head Christian Dailey as executive producer. Goldman left BioWare by November 2021, and was replaced as Creative Director by John Epler. Dailey left BioWare in February 2022. Corinne Busche became game director thereafter, Benoit Houle director of product development, and Mac Walters production director. Walters in turn left BioWare in January 2023.

There was reported speculation that the combat in the game will be different than the rest of the series based on unconfirmed leaks of Alpha-stage footage in February 2023. Kotaku stated that it "features fully real-time combat and was allegedly designed as BioWare's take on God of War".

Marketing 
Dragon Age 4 was announced at The Game Awards in December 2018. Promotional material showed red lyrium (a corrupted power source of magic in the game's universe) and the character Solas – the Dread Wolf – as significant elements of the game's plot. Marketing on social media was focused on the tagline "The Dread Wolf Rises".

In August 2020, a concept art video was released at Gamescom. In December 2020, a teaser trailer featured the dwarven character Varric Tethras as narrator, as well as Solas. No details on the game were released at the July 2021 EA Play event. Jeffrey Grubb, for VentureBeat, commented that "holding back during this EA Play is just about enabling the publisher to get the game into position to begin marketing it in earnest. That will likely start in 2022". Ash Parrish, for Kotaku, highlighted that given all the changes in development "Dragon Age 4 is probably not yet ready to be shown to the world" and that "BioWare has been drip-feeding fans information for years now". Grubb, in a follow-up article for VentureBeat in January 2022, stated that "EA hasn't decided on when to begin marketing the project".

In June 2022, the game’s title was announced as Dragon Age: Dreadwolf. Parrish, now for The Verge, highlighted that the title reveal for the game was "exciting for a lot of fans" because it not only makes Solas the antagonist of the upcoming game but also makes Dreadwolf a direct sequel unlike previous installments in the franchise.

References

Upcoming video games
Action role-playing video games
BioWare games
Dragon Age
Electronic Arts games
Fantasy video games
Video games developed in Canada